The 1996 World Artistic Gymnastics Championships were held in San Juan, Puerto Rico, from 16 to 20 April 1996.

The team and all-around events were not contested at the 1996 Artistic Gymnastics World Championships. The format was similar to that of the 1992 and 2002 Worlds, with medals being awarded for the individual WAG and MAG apparatus. There were three rounds of competition: the preliminary round open to everyone; the semi-finals open to the top sixteen qualifiers; and the finals for the top eight gymnasts.Until 2021,the 1996 Artistic Gymnastics World Championships were also the last to be held in the same year as a Summer Olympics.

Medalists

Medal table

Overall

Men

Women

Men

Floor exercise

Pommel horse

Still rings

Vault

Parallel bars

Horizontal bar

Women

Vault

Uneven bars

Balance beam

Floor exercise

References 

World Artistic Gymnastics Championships
G
W
G